Kabud Gonbad (also Romanized as Kabūd Gonbad; also known as Shubend) is a village in Soltaniyeh Rural District, Soltaniyeh District, Abhar County, Zanjan Province, Iran. At the 2006 census, its population was 385, in 85 families.

References 

Populated places in Abhar County